St. Theresa's High School is a high school in Midland, Ontario, Canada administered by the Simcoe Muskoka Catholic District School Board. The school serves students from Midland, Penetanguishene, Tay Township, Tiny Township and a portion of Springwater Township (Elmvale). The current enrollment is 700 students from grade 9–12. The current administration consists of principal George Luck, vice principals Megan Clark and Karen McNamara.

Midland, Ontario
High schools in Simcoe County
High schools in Ontario